Patrick Heckmann (born 27 February 1992) is a German professional basketball player for Brose Bamberg of the Basketball Bundesliga (BBL). He played college basketball for Boston College.

College statistics

Professional career
In June 2015 Heckmann signed with German team Brose Bamberg. In December 2016, he signed a two-year extension with the team. In February 2019, Heckmann signed a deal with ratiopharm Ulm.

On 1 July 2021 he signed with Brose Bamberg of the Basketball Bundesliga (BBL).

International career
In 2012, Heckmann played in 2 exhibition games for the German national basketball team.

References

External links
Boston College Eagles bio

1992 births
Living people
Boston College Eagles men's basketball players
Brose Bamberg players
German expatriate basketball people in the United States
German men's basketball players
Ratiopharm Ulm players
Small forwards
Sportspeople from Mainz